Separation Creek is a small coastal locality in the Shire of Colac Otway, Victoria, Australia. In the 2016 census, Separation Creek had a population of 19.

The village is situated at the mouth of the Separation Creek, on the Great Ocean Road, which follows the coast through the locality. There are no shops at Separation Creek; the nearest shop and hotel is located at Wye River, which is connected to the town by the Great Ocean Road and on foot by Paddys Path. In July 2014, the federal government announced a $4m upgrade of the Separation Creek bridge, with a new pedestrian walkway across the creek to allow for safer access between the towns.

The Wye River Separation Creek Progress Association is a local community organisation which aims to "advance the welfare and protect the environment" of the two towns. Singer Mike Brady has a beach house in the village.

Separation Creek has a 250m long beach, which is unpatrolled year-round. Surf Life Saving Australia describes the beach as "suitable for a picnic or fishing, but unsuitable for safe bathing". It gives the beach a hazard rating of 7/10 (highly hazardous).

The remainder of the locality, outside the township, is almost entirely covered today by the Great Otway National Park and the Otway Forest Park. There are only two inland roads through the locality outside the township itself: Wye Road runs inland from the coast, much of it forming the border with Wye River, and the Benwerrin-Mount Sabine Road runs roughly north–south around the western edge of the locality.

On Christmas Day 2015 a bushfire destroyed at least 18 homes in Separation Creek. At nearby Wye River another 98 homes were destroyed. There were no deaths at either town.

References

Towns in Victoria (Australia)
Coastal towns in Victoria (Australia)
Otway Ranges